= European Journal of Medical Genetics =

Medical journal

- Discipline: Medical genetics
- Language: English
- Edited by: Alain Verloes

Publication details
- Former name(s): Annales de Génétique
- History: 1958–present
- Publisher: Elsevier
- Frequency: Monthly
- Impact factor: 2.708 (2020)

Standard abbreviations
- ISO 4: Eur. J. Med. Genet.

Indexing
- ISSN: 1769-7212 (print); 1878-0849 (web)
- OCLC no.: 889585345

Links
- Journal homepage; Online access; Online archive

The European Journal of Medical Genetics is a monthly peer-reviewed medical journal covering medical genetics in human and experimental systems. It was established in 1958 as Annales de Génétique, obtaining its current name in 2005. It is published by Elsevier and the editor-in-chief is Alain Verloes (CHU Robert Debré). According to the Journal Citation Reports, the journal has a 2018 impact factor of 2.022.
